Kappa Pegasi (κ Peg, κ Pegasi) is a triple star system in the constellation Pegasus. It has an apparent brightness of +4.13 magnitude and belongs to the spectral class F5IV; a subgiant star. No proper name is associated to this star.

This system consists of two components, designated Kappa Pegasi A and B, that are separated by an angular distance of 0.235 arcseconds. The binary nature of this pair was discovered by Sherburne W. Burnham in 1880. They orbit around each other every 11.6 years with a semimajor axis of 0.4 arcseconds. The brighter member of the pair, Kappa Pegasi B, is actually a spectroscopic binary, with the components designated Kappa Pegasi Ba and Kappa Pegasi Bb. They orbit about each other every six days. There is a fourth component, Kappa Pegasi C, which may be an optical companion.

References

Pegasus, Kappa
Pegasi, 10
Pegasus (constellation)
F-type subgiants
Spectroscopic binaries
206901
8315
Durchmusterung objects
Triple star systems
107354